is a passenger railway station in the city of Funabashi, Chiba, Japan, operated by the private railway operator Tōbu Railway. The station is numbered "TD-33".

Lines 

Station layout
The station consists of two opposed side platforms serving two tracks, with an elevated station building.

Platforms

Adjacent stations

History
Tsukada Station opened on 27 December 1923.

From 17 March 2012, station numbering was introduced on all Tobu lines, with Tsukada Station becoming "TD-33".

Passenger statistics
In fiscal 2019, the station was used by an average of 16,203 passengers daily.

Surrounding area
Tsukada Post Office
Gyoda Park
Chiba Prefectural Funabashi Keimei High School

See also
 List of railway stations in Japan

References

External links

  

Railway stations in Japan opened in 1923
Railway stations in Chiba Prefecture
Tobu Noda Line
Stations of Tobu Railway
Funabashi